The Traffic Penalty Tribunal is a tribunal in the United Kingdom which manages appeals against penalty charge notices or PCNs, a form of civil penalty, for areas in England outside of London. It was created by statute to fulfil provisions of the Traffic Management Act 2004, it is partly responsible to the PATROL joint committee, a collection of local authorities responsible for enforcing PCNs who make use of the traffic penalty tribunals adjudication process.

Decisions of the Traffic Penalty Tribunal can be challenged by judicial review. The appeal process is governed by the Civil Enforcement of Parking Contraventions (England) Representations and Appeals Regulations 2007 and The Civil Enforcement of Parking Contraventions (England) General Regulations 2007.

The tribunal handles roughly 25000 cases per year, the vast majority of appeals are handled virtually.

References 

Tribunals